Wanderson Carvalho de Oliveira (born 31 March 1989), simply known as Wanderson, is a Brazilian professional footballer who plays as a left back or winger for Pohang Steelers of K League 1.

Career
Wanderson has played for Bahia de Feira, América RN, América MG, Tombense and Fortaleza at various levels of Brazilian football.

Wanderson joined Daejeon Citizen in K League 1 in July 2015, scoring two goals in his debut.

In March 2022, Wanderson came back to Pohang Steelers.

References

External links

1989 births
Living people
Brazilian footballers
Association football fullbacks
Association football wingers
Campeonato Brasileiro Série B players
Campeonato Brasileiro Série C players
América Futebol Clube (RN) players
América Futebol Clube (MG) players
Tombense Futebol Clube players
Fortaleza Esporte Clube players
Atlético Clube Goianiense players
K League 1 players
K League 2 players
UAE Pro League players
Daejeon Hana Citizen FC players
Jeju United FC players
Pohang Steelers players
Jeonnam Dragons players
Al-Ittihad Kalba SC players
Brazilian expatriate footballers
Brazilian expatriate sportspeople in South Korea
Expatriate footballers in South Korea
Brazilian expatriate sportspeople in the United Arab Emirates
Expatriate footballers in the United Arab Emirates